Lotay Tshering (born 10 May 1969) is a Bhutanese politician and surgeon who is the current Prime Minister of Bhutan, in office since 7 November 2018. He has also been the president of Druk Nyamrup Tshogpa since 14 May 2018.

Early life and education
Tshering was born on 10 May 1969,  in a humble family. He hails from Dalukha village, Mewang Gewog, Thimphu.

He received his early education from Punakha High School and graduated from Sherubtse College. He graduated from Mymensingh Medical College under the University of Dhaka, Bangladesh and received a degree of MBBS in 2001. He completed his post-graduation in surgery from the Bangabandhu Sheikh Mujib Medical University in Dhaka, Bangladesh. In 2007, he studied Urology at the Medical College of Wisconsin, the USA, under his World Health Organisation fellowship. Upon his return to Bhutan, he was the only practicing trained urologist in his country. In 2010, he obtained a fellowship in Endourology at Singapore General Hospital, Singapore, and Okayama University, Japan. He received a Master of Business Administration degree from University of Canberra, Australia in 2014.

Personal life
Tshering  is married to a doctor, Ugyen Dema. The couple has one daughter. During his tenure in Mongar Regional Referral Hospital, he adopted one girl and one boy. Tshering speaks several languages, including Dzongkha, Lotshamkha, Bengali and English.

Professional career
Tshering served as a consultant surgeon in JDWNRH and Mongar Regional Referral Hospital, and was also served as a consultant urologist in JDWNRH for 11 years.

After the payment of about Nu. 6.2 million to the Royal Civil Service Commission, he resigned from the JDWNRH as a urologist to join politics in 2013.

Political career
Tshering contested the 2013 National Assembly Election but his party was knocked out in the primary round.

On 14 May 2018, Tshering received 1,155 votes and was elected as the president of the Druk Nyamrup Tshogpa (DNT) just five months before the Third National Assembly Election.

He was elected to the National Assembly of Bhutan as a candidate of DNT from South Thimphu constituency in 2018 Bhutanese National Assembly election. He received 3,662 votes, defeating Kinley Tshering, a candidate of DPT. His party won largest number of seats in the 2018 National Assembly Election, bringing Tshering to premiership and Druk Nyamrup Tshogpa into government for the first time.

Prime Minister 

On 7 November 2018, he replaced Tshering Tobgay and was sworn in as 3rd democratically elected Prime Minister of Bhutan.

On 27 December 2018, he arrived in India (three-day visit) on his first foreign trip after assuming the office.

On 13 April 2019, he arrived in Bangladesh on an official visit and subsequently on 24 March 2021, on behalf of His Majesty to celebrate the Golden Jubilee of Bangladesh's independence.

Cabinet 

Tshering announced his 10 cabinet ministers on 3 November 2018.

Awards
1991: He was awarded the Father William Mackey Gold Medal for academic excellence by Sherubtse College.
2005: He was awarded the Unsung Hero of Compassion Award by 14th Dalai Lama.
2017: He was awarded the Order of the Beloved Son of the Dragon Medal (Druk Jong Thuksey) by King Jigme Khesar Namgyel Wangchuck for his "selfless and dedicated service to the Tsawa-Sum (our King, our country and our people)."
2018: Royal Orange Scarf by King Jigme Khesar Namgyel Wangchuck for "his appointment as the Prime Minister".
2020: Lungmar Scarf by King Jigme Khesar Namgyel Wangchuck for "his unwavering effort and contribution in fighting the ongoing pandemic as the Prime Minister". Tshering is the second person, after former Prime Minister Dasho Tshering Tobgay, to be awarded this scarf since the creation of this award by the Third King, who was the King of Bhutan between 1952 to 1972.

References

 
1969 births
Living people
Prime Ministers of Bhutan
Bhutanese urologists
Druk Nyamrup Tshogpa politicians
University of Dhaka alumni
Bangabandhu Sheikh Mujib Medical University alumni
Bhutanese MNAs 2018–2023
People from Thimphu District
Druk Nyamrup Tshogpa MNAs
Okayama University alumni